Barrie Phillip Nichol (30 September 1944 – 25 September 1988), known as bpNichol, was a Canadian poet, writer, sound poet, editor, Creative Writing teacher at York University in Toronto and grOnk/Ganglia Press publisher. His body of work encompasses poetry, children's books, television scripts,  novels, short fiction, computer texts, and sound poetry. His love of language and writing, evident in his many accomplishments, continues to be carried forward by many.

Work
Nichol was born in Vancouver, British Columbia. Though his early writing consisted of fiction and lyrical poems, he first received international recognition in the 1960s for concrete poetry. The first major publications included Journeying & the returns (1967), a purple box containing visual & lyrical poems and Konfessions of an Elizabethan Fan Dancer (1969) a book of concrete poetry. He won the 1970 Governor General's Award for poetry with four publications: the prose booklet The True Eventual Story of Billy the Kid a collection of lyrical poems, Beach Head, the boxed concrete sequence, Still Water and The Cosmic Chef, a boxed anthology of concrete and visual poetry.

His best known work, The Martyrology (1972–1992) is an open-ended, lifelong poem that investigates language. The 'saints' are drawn from 'st' words (storm becomes St. Orm) and their spiritual quest provides a springboard from which linguistic issues of textuality, reading and writing are explored.

Nichol frequently collaborated with other artists. The work of the sound poetry group, The Four Horsemen (Nichol, Rafael Barreto-Rivera, Paul Dutton and Steve McCaffery) has been documented in Volcano Theatre's stage performances of The Four Horsemen Project (Dora Mavor Moore Award 2007 & 2015). He collaborated with Steve McCaffrey to form The Toronto Research Group (TRG), with Barbara Caruso, visual artist, with R. Murray Schafer,  Howard Gerhard and John Beckwith,  composers.

Nichol's zest for publishing other writers was reflected in founding Ganglia Press with David Aylward in 1964 and grOnk in 1967 with Aylward, Rob Hindley-Smith and David UU ( David W. Harris). He was a volunteer editor at Coach House Books from 1975 to his death. In 1978, he was one of the collective that established Underwhich Editions which edited, designed, published and distributed the works of worthy writers. During the 1970s and 80s, he was a contributing editor of Open Letter, a literary magazine.

Nichol also had a large presence on screens of various sizes. In the mid-1980s, he became a writer for the children's television show, Fraggle Rock, created by Jim Henson. Soon, scriptwriting for other children's television shows followed: The Raccoons, Under the Umbrella Tree, Care Bears and Babar. Several films include bp and his work, starting with Michael Ondaatje's short film, Sons of Captain Poetry; Ron Mann's Poetry in Motion followed by bp: pushing the boundaries, directed by Brian Nash, and more recently, Justin Stephenson's  award-winning film, The Complete Works. He died in Toronto, Ontario, five days shy of his 44th birthday. Since his death, there has been an upsurge of interest in First Screenings, Nichol's 1984 computer poem (updated by Jim Andrews and his team) which has been part of electronic exhibitions from Mexico to Oakville.

Therafields 
Barrie Nichol / bpNichol was also a central figure in the psychoanalytic community Therafields, from the early 1960s into the early 1980s, with his formal resignation as vice-president of the organization in 1982. Nichol dedicates The Martyrology to the founder, Lea Hindley-Smith, “for lea / without whose act of friendship / quite literally none of this would have been written’ (14) and the work makes many references to Therafields, Lea, the Annex, and Mono Mills, where the organization owned multiple properties, and some named individuals. Nichol “underwent personal therapy” in 1963” with Lea, and he is credited with stating, ”In my case, I think therapy literally saved my life” (Scobie 18).  A City of Toronto heritage planning document notes Lea Hindley-Smith was "not documented as having completed any formal training in psychotherapy."

There is extensive documentation of Nichol's close ties to the Hindley-Smith family. Grant Goodbrand's Therafields: The Rise and Fall of Lea Hindley-Smith’s Psychoanalytic Commune (2010) describes Nichol as a member of Therafields “inner circle” (Ch.2) from early on, a “part of the learning experience from in Therafields from the beginning” (ch. 7). Photos document Nichol's at the Therafields' farm, including a  Sept. 1974 group photo with Nichol standing with Lea, Visvaldis, Rob, and others. Maureen Jennings, author of the Murdoch Mysteries series, is also present at the front of the "staff photo" taken at the Willow (another Mono Mills property), lower left. Nichol's brother, Don (DJ) is in second row on the right. Nichol donated proceeds from readings from "The Complete Published Martyrology "(1977) "towards the publication of the next volume in Lea Hindley-Smith's Summonsa Tapestries."

Goodbrand notes he first heard of Therafields in 1964 from bpNichol (183), that Nichol was best friends with Lea's second son, Rob/Robert Hindley-Smith, that in 1966 Nichol moved in with Lea's family for three years, sharing a room with Rob.

Nichol continued to live with Rob for many years thereafter, living with Rob and others in various properties owned by Lea, other inner circle members, and the Therafields corporation until 1975. Nichol took on a number of key roles, including from 1966 doing “the diagnostic testing of new clients” and “the pairing of clients with therapists” (ch. 7), and running artists marathons. Scobie notes Nichol conducting “theradramas”(69). Brenda Doyle's The Therafields Psychotherapy Community: Promise, Betrayal, and Demise (2020) offers many details on “the boys” whom Lea placed in charge in 1967 of “practical administration, subject always to her approval” (39). With the incorporation of Therafields in Sept 1969, Rob Hindley-Smith (then 20) became president, Barrie Nichol was appointed vice-president, with Renwick Day in the role of treasurer (Ch. 10). Neither Rob nor Nichol had any business experience. Doyle notes Rob “had not completed high school, had never held a job, and had no experience of management” (37). She describes Nichol as “Lea’s other ‘son’ of trust and closeness” (37), detailing the family living at arrangement at 59 Admiral.

Nichol's continued in the role of vice-president until his resignation, which Goodbrand cites as May 1982, the year of financial collapse. Doyle notes that before the bankruptcy, attempts were made to “dislodge Rob as administrator” (172). Goodbrand suggests “A POEM BY bpNICHOL —INSPIRED BY THE MONDAY MORNING SEMINAR, MARCH 23, 1981”, illuminates the “tension that continued to exist between the management of Therafields and the therapists” and that it was “occasioned by [Barrie’s] frustration and bitterness towards his colleagues.”

Nichol's ongoing central role as vice-president through the final years is detailed in Goodbrand's account. Attempting to resolve the financial crisis regarding properties and community shares, Goodbrand describes how in June 1981 a trust fund “was set up in the names of Rob, Barrie, and Renwick. The loan was backed not only by the corporation’s assets, but also personally by all three men’s assets.”

Ongoing deterioration within the community led to Goodbrand describing 1984 as the year “The family created in 1968 with Lea, Visvaldis, Rob and Barrie fell apart” (Ch 18).

Nichol's separation of these two spheres of his life is emphasized by Goodbrand who describes “Barrie [as living] in two communities: the one of his everyday life, and the other with those who shared the life of writing.”

A similar separation is described by The Four Horsemen poet, Steve McCaffery to Peter Jaeger in “that Nichol 'tended to live a double life (that certainly was my experience) in which his creativity and the public life that that entailed were kept separate from lay-analytic practice ... at Therafields'” (quoted in Schmaltz 167).

Nichol's 1980 musical, Group: A Therapeutic Musical, co-written with Nelles Van Loon, presents a scripted, fictionalized version of the Therafields’ process for group psychoanalysis. Goodbrand describes Nichol's "artists marathons" as one of only two "new therapies invented by other therapists," the other being Adam Crabtree's work on "possession as a psychological phenomenon in the creation and maintenance of obdurate neuroses."

Commemoration

The bpNichol Chapbook Award,
a prize for poetry publications between 10 and 48 pages, was established in 1986 by Phoenix Community Works Foundation. This annual award for excellence in Canadian Poetry in English is now administered by Meet the Presses collective.

A street in Toronto, Ontario, Canada, is named in his honour. bpNichol Lane is located near Huron and Sussex Streets beside Coach House Press. It features an eight-line poem by Nichol carved into the pavement: "A / LAKE / A / LANE / A / LINE / A / LONE".

Bibliography

Poetry
Cycles Etc. (Cleveland: 7 Flowers Press, 1965)
Scraptures: second sequence (Toronto: Ganglia Press, 1965)
Journeying & the returns (Toronto: Coach House, 1967)
Konfessions of an Elizabethan Fan Dancer (London: Writers Forum, 1967; Toronto: Weed/Flower Press, 1973; Toronto: Coach House Books, 2004)
Still Water (Vancouver: Talonbooks, 1970)
The other side of the room (Toronto: Weed/Flower Press, 1971)
Monotones (Vancouver: Talonbooks, 1971)
The Captain Poetry Poems (blewointment press, 1971; Toronto: BookThug, 2011)
The Martyrology, Books 1 & 2 (Toronto: Coach House, 1972)
Love: A Book of Remembrances (Vancouver: Talonbooks, 1974)
The Martyrology, Books 3 & 4 (Toronto: Coach House, 1976)
Selected Writing: as elected (Vancouver: Talonbooks, 1980)
The Martyrology, Book 5 (Toronto: Coach House, 1982)
First Screening (Calgary: Red Deer College Press, 1984; vispo.com)
Zygal: a book of mysteries & translations (Toronto: Coach House, 1985)
The Martyrology, Book 6 Books (Toronto: Coach House, 1987)
Gifts: the Martyrology Book(s) 7 & (Toronto: Coach House, 1990)
Ad Sanctos: the Martyrology Book 9 – a performance work with Howard Gerhard (Toronto: Coach House, 1993)
Truth: a book of Fictions (Toronto: Mercury Press, 1993. Irene Niechoda, ed.)
Art Facts: a book of contexts (Arizona: Chax Press, 1990)
a book of variations: love-zygal-art facts (Toronto: Coach House, 2013. Stephen Voyce, ed.)
bp: beginnings (Toronto: BookThug, 2014. Stephen Cain, ed.)

Booklets
Scraptures: 2nd Sequence (Toronto: Ganglia Press, 1965)
The Birth of O (Toronto: Ganglia Press, 1966)
Cold Mountain (Toronto: Ganglia Press, Singing Hands Series 3, 1966; Toronto: Coach House Press, 1967; Vancouver: Fingerprinting Inkoperated, 1992)
Ruth (Toronto: Fleye Press, 1967; Hamilton: MindWare, 1993)
Ballads of the Restless Are (Sacramento: The Runcible Spoon Press, 1968)
Lament (Toronto: Ganglia Press, 1969; London, England, Writers Foum, 1969)
The true eventual story of Billy the Kid (Toronto: Weed/Flower Press, 1970)
Beach Head (Sacramento: Runcible Spoon, 1970)
ABC: the Aleph Beth Book (Toronto: Oberon Press, 1971) 
Grease Ball Comics 2 (Toronto: Ganglia Press, 1972)
Aleph Unit (Toronto: Seripress, 1973)
White Sound : a variant (Toronto: Ganglia Press, 1976)
Scraptures 2nd Sequence: Alternate Takes (Vancouver: BCMonthly, 1977)
Alphhabet Ilphbet (Toronto: Seripress, 1978)
Translating translating Apollinaire: a preliminary report (Milwaukee: Membrane press, 1979)
The Story of the Boat Peope (Tpronto: Operation Lifline, 1980)
Extreme Positions (Edmonton: Longspoon Press, 1981)
Continental Trance (Lantzville, BC: Oolichan books, 1982)
The Frog Variations (Toronto: Curvd H&z, 1983)
Transformational Unit (self-published in 1983 as a Christmas gift)
continuum (Toronto: Underwhich Editions, 1984)
Critical Frame of Reference (Toronto, Pataphysical Hardware Company, 1985; reprinted 1992)
8 Lines on/of/as H's + 2 Alpha Pairings (Toronto: Letters, 1986; reprinted 1994)
Librarians Need A Break (Toronto: Underwhich Editions, 1987)
Bored Messengers (Prince George, B.C: Gorse Press, 1988)
Back Lane Letters (Toronto: Letters, 1994)
Holiday (Ottawa: Curvd H&z, 1999)

Prose
Two Novels (Toronto: Coach House, 1971)
Craft Dinner (Aya Press, 1978)
Journal (Toronto: Coach House, 1978)
Still (Vancouver: Pulp Press, winner of the 3-day novel writing contest 1983)
Selected Organs: parts of an autobiography (Windsor: Black Moss Press, 1988)
 
organ music: parts of an autobiography ( Windsor: Black Moss Press, 2015)
Trois Contes de l'ouest (Quebec: Le Quartanier, 2015. Christophe Bernard, translator)

Television credits
Fraggle Rock (Henson & Associates & CBC TV, 1984–1987)
Under the Umbrella Tree (Noreen Young Productions & CBC Television, 1986–1987)
The Raccoons (Evergreen Raccoons Ltd, 1986)
Care Bears; Babar (TV series) (Nelvana Studios, 1986–1988)
Blizzard Island (Studio East & CBC Television, 1985–1988)

Critical studies and reviews of Nichol's work
Rational geomancy

Related books
bpNichol: What History Teaches (Stephen Scobie, Talonbooks, 1984)
Read the Way he writes: A festschrift for bpNichol (Open Letter, Sixth Series, No. 5-6, 1986)
Tracing the Paths: Reading ≠ Writing the Martyrology (Line Magazine, No. 10 & Talonbooks, 1988)
Rational Geomancy: the collected research reports of the Toronto Research Group 1973-1982 (Steve McCaffery & bpNichol, Talonbooks, 1992)
A Sourcery for Books 1&2 of bpNichol's Martyrology (Irene Niechoda, ECW Press, 1992)
Meanwhile: the critical writings of bpNichol (Roy Miki, ed., Talonbooks, 1992)
An H in the Heart: bpNichol: A Reader (George Bowering & Michael Ondaatje ed., McClelland & Stewart, 1994.)
bpNichol Comics (Carl Peters, ed., Talonbooks, 2002)
The Alphabet Game: a bpNichol Reader (Darren Wershler-Henry & Lori Emerson, ed., Coach House Books, 2007)

See also

Canadian literature
Canadian poetry
List of Canadian poets

References

External links
 bpNichol.ca

1944 births
1988 deaths
20th-century Canadian poets
Canadian male poets
Writers from Vancouver
Writers from Toronto
20th-century Canadian male writers
Canadian television writers
Visual poets